The 2003 Sultan Azlan Shah Cup was the 12th edition of field hockey tournament the Sultan Azlan Shah Cup.

Participating nations
Five countries participated in the tournament:

Results

Preliminary round

Fixtures

Classification round

Third and fourth place

Final

Awards

Statistics

Final standings

Goalscorers

References

External links
Official website

Sultan Azlan Shah Cup
Sultan Azlan Shah Cup
Sultan Azlan Shah Cup
Sultan Azlan Shah Cup